Rick Shaw may refer to:
 Rick Shaw (journalist) (born 1956), American journalism academic and journalist
 Rick Shaw (radio) (1938–2017), American disc jockey, radio and television personality
 Rick Shaw (American football) (born 1946), American football player

See also
 Rickshaw, a pedestrian-powered vehicle for carrying one or two passengers
 Ricky Shaw (born 1965), American football player
 Richard Shaw (disambiguation)